Mendi, Papua New Guinea, is the provincial capital of the Southern Highlands Province. The Lai River flows by the town. It is served by Mendi Airport. The town falls under Mendi Urban LLG.

Geography 
The Kikori River originates from the mountainous area where Mendi is located, and the Erave and Strickland rivers flow through the Giluwe Mountains, the second highest peak of Papua New Guinea.

Climate
Köppen-Geiger climate classification system classifies its climate as a subtropical highland climate (Cfb). Mendi features cool mornings, warm afternoons and heavy rainfall throughout the year.

Economy 
Mendi's population is dense and the economy is relatively good. The town has vegetable and coffee plantations and tea gardens, as well as a sawmill. Mendi's traffic is mostly dependent on air transport.

Events
In mid-June 2018 a regional crisis occurred in Mendi when the Papua New Guinea central government declared a state of emergency and suspended the Southern Highlands provincial government based in Mendi for nine months.  Rioting had occurred when a regional court had ruled against a challenge to a provincial election by the losing candidate.  A local warehouse was looted, buildings in Mendi were torched, and a Link PNG plane parked at the airport was destroyed by fire. Troops were sent in by the Papua New Guinea government to restore order.

See also
Mendi Urban LLG
Upper Mendi Rural LLG

References

Provincial capitals in Papua New Guinea
Populated places in Southern Highlands Province